Miyoshi may refer to:

Places
Miyoshi, Aichi, a city in Aichi Prefecture
Miyoshi, Chiba, a former village in Chiba Prefecture
Miyoshi, Hiroshima, a city in Hiroshima Prefecture
Miyoshi, Saitama, a town in Saitama Prefecture
Miyoshi, Tokushima, a city in Tokushima Prefecture
Miyoshi, Tokushima (Town), a former town in Tokushima Prefecture
Miyoshi District, Tokushima, a district in Tokushima Prefecture

People with the given name
, Japanese pilot officer
, Japanese speed skater
, Japanese-American actress and singer

Other uses
Miyoshi (surname)
Miyoshi clan, Japanese clan

Japanese feminine given names